Fugdi is a  Maharashtra and Goan folk dance performed by the women in the Konkan region during Hindu religious festivals like Ganesh Chaturthi and Vrata or towards the end of other dances like Dhalo.According to certain historical facts, this dance style is said to have been created from few ancient Goan traditions. In addition, this dance is mainly performed during the Hindu month of “Bhaadrapaada”, when women usually take a break to escape boredom arising from their daily routines. Furthermore, it is also performed during religious and social events.

Traditional roots
Fugdi is an art form that can be traced to the primeval cultural traditions of Maharashtra and Goa. It is performed during various religious and social occasions. Fugdi is generally performed during the month of Bhaadrapada, an occasion for the women to take a temporary break from their normal, monotonous schedule. A distinctive style of fugdi is found among the dhangar (shepherd community) women. The kalashi fugdi is performed before goddess Mahalaxkshmi during the vrata offered to that goddess.

Technique
The women sing and dance while enacting varied formations - in a circle or in rows. Usually women in the villages dance Fugdi in circles and women in forest settlements formulate rows.  The dance starts with invocation to Hindu Gods. The pace is slow in the beginning, but soon attains a fast pace, reaching climax. No percussion support is provided. At the maximum pace, the dancers match the rhythm by blowing air through the mouth that sounds like "FOO". Hence the name Foogdi or Fugdi. A few fixed steps and hand gestures and hand laps are the major elements. No instrument or musical accompaniment is found with the dance, but special fugdi songs are innumerable.

Sub-forms
Girki, Cycle, Rahat, Zimma, Karvar, Bus Fugdi, Kombda, Ghuma, and Pakhwa are among the popular sub-forms. Kalashi Fugdi began as a means to break the monotony of the routine of fetching water from long distances. The women would dance their way out to the water-holes while blowing into the empty pitchers. Katti Fugdi is another popular form, performed with coconut shells in their hands.

See also
 Deknni
 Shigmo
 Mando
 Dulpod
 Kikkli

References

Indian folk dances
Goan dances